The Schwarz function of a curve in the complex plane is an analytic function which maps the points of the curve to their complex conjugates. It can be used to generalize the Schwarz reflection principle to reflection across arbitrary analytic curves, not just across the real axis.

The Schwarz function exists for analytic curves.

The "Schwarz function" was named by Philip J. Davis and Henry O. Pollak (1958) in honor of Hermann Schwarz, who introduced the Schwarz reflection principle for analytic curves in 1870. However, the Schwarz function does not explicitly appear in Schwarz's works.

Examples

The result is:
.
This is analytic on the complex plane minus a branch cut along the line segment between the foci .

References 

 

Analytic functions